Giovanni Poggi may refer to:

Giovanni Poggio, also written Poggi, 16th century Italian bishop and cardinal
Giovanni Poggi (historian) (1880–1961), Italian historian and museum curator